Sega Zone was a Sega orientated publication from Dennis Publishing in the early 1990s.  Sega Zone had split off from the former multiformat console title Game Zone, which continued as a Nintendo magazine.  Early Dennis Publishing staff members included launch editor Amaya Lopez, deputy editor Vivienne Nagy, and staff writer Martin Pond.

In 1993 Sega Zone, along with Game Zone, was sold to Future Publishing.  During this period Sega Zone had the following familiar Future names working for the magazine; Tim Norris (editor), Tim Tucker (deputy editor), Josse Billson (staff writer) and Stuart Campbell (longtime contributor).

In early 1994 Future Publishing itself sold the Sega Zone title onto Maverick Magazines. The same year the titles faded away.

See also
 Sega Power
 Sega Force
 Sega Pro
 Mean Machines Sega
 Sega Magazine

References

External links
  AP2 - Amiga Power tribute site, Sega Zone page.
  World of Stuart web site Selection of Sega Zone reviews and features by Stuart Campbell.
 Archived Sega Zone magazines on the Internet Archive

Defunct computer magazines published in the United Kingdom
Home computer magazines
Magazines established in 1992
Magazines disestablished in 1994
Magazines published in London
Monthly magazines published in the United Kingdom
Video game magazines published in the United Kingdom
Sega magazines